The Fortress of Charlemont is a French stronghold located near the Belgian border on the Meuse. It is a citadel, surrounded by a network of outworks, including the connecting forts (Givet and the Mont d'Hours). It dominates the town of Givet and when in use as a working fortress controlled the valley of the Meuse.

See also
Reduction of the French fortresses in 1815 — this fortress was the last to surrender to the Coalition.
Meuse Citadels — a group of forts situated along the Meuse river in southern Belgium.

Notes

References
 
 

Charlemont
Buildings and structures in Ardennes (department)